Witch house may refer to the following:

 Witch House, a 1945 novel by Evangeline Walton
 Witch House, an EP by American heavy metal band Acid Witch
 Witch house (genre), an electronic music subgenre
 The Witch House, the home of Judge Jonathan Corwin and the only remaining structure in Salem, Massachusetts with direct ties to the Salem witch trials of 1692